Radiate is a mobile app that connects people going to the same events as one another. 

They are branded as "not a dating app", although they have been compared to Tinder, especially with Tinder's introduction of Festival Mode. Insomniac, producer of Electric Daisy Carnival has said "One of the primary reasons people go to festivals is for the community, and that’s what Radiate provides."

History 
Radiate was founded by Michael Tom and Philip Butler in 2015.

They debuted at the electronic dance music festival Electric Adventure in August 2015.

On May 27, 2019, Radiate was featured on Product Hunt.

Radiate's gained initial traction around large music festivals, with users using the app to meet and interact with others going to festivals such as Electric Daisy Carnival, Tomorrowland, Ultra Music Festival, and Lollapalooza. Recently, Radiate has also been adding artist tours, including partnerships with artists such as Dillon Francis and Flosstradamus.

In July 2020, Radiate released a feature called Spaces, which allows users to move in a virtual 2-dimensional space, interact with each other through video chat, and listen to or watch a common livestream.

In December 2021, Radiate cofounder Michael Tom was featured in the Forbes 30 Under 30 list.

Features 

Users can opt into events, and then post images and text for others within the event to see. Users can anonymously say "Hey" to each other, and if both users say "Hey", a chat will open up between them. In addition to the forums, users can also "swipe" through other users, using a mechanic similar to Tinder.

References

External links 
 

Geosocial networking
Mobile social software
Online dating services of the United States
Internet properties established in 2015
IOS software
Privately held companies of the United States
American social networking websites